Sally Ann Hodge-McKenzie (born 31 May 1966) is a Welsh former track cyclist from Cardiff, Wales.

Cycling career
She was the first ever women's points race world champion at the 1988 UCI Track Cycling World Championships in Ghent, Belgium. She represented Britain at the 1988 Summer Olympics in Seoul, South Korea and the 1992 Summer Olympics in Barcelona, Spain. She won the bronze medal at the 1994 Commonwealth Games in Victoria, British Columbia, Canada.

In addition to her international success she was a 13 times British track champion, winning the British National Individual Sprint Championships in 1983 and 1985, the British National Points Championships in 1987, 1988, 1991, 1992, 1993 & 1994, the British National Individual Pursuit Championships in 1987 and 1988 and the British National Individual Time Trial Championships in 1985, 1987 and 1988.

Canlyniadau

1983
1st British National Individual Sprint Championships

1985
1st British National Individual Sprint Championships
1st British National Individual Time Trial Championships

1987
1st British National Points Championships
1st British National Individual Pursuit Championships
1st British National Individual Time Trial Championships
2nd British National Road Race Championships

1988
1st UCI Track Cycling World Championships - Women's Points Race
1st British National Points Championships
1st British National Individual Pursuit Championships
1st British National Individual Time Trial Championships
2nd British National Road Race Championships
9th Cycling at the 1988 Summer Olympics - Women's individual road race

1989
1st British National Points Championships

1991
1st British National Points Championships

1992
1st British National Points Championships
45th Cycling at the 1992 Summer Olympics – Women's road race

1993
1st British National Points Championships

1994
1st British National Points Championships
3rd Points race, Commonwealth Games

References

External links

1966 births
Living people
Welsh female cyclists
Olympic cyclists of Great Britain
Cyclists at the 1988 Summer Olympics
Cyclists at the 1992 Summer Olympics
Commonwealth Games bronze medallists for Wales
Cyclists at the 1994 Commonwealth Games
Sportspeople from Cardiff
UCI Track Cycling World Champions (women)
Commonwealth Games medallists in cycling
Welsh track cyclists
Medallists at the 1994 Commonwealth Games